Alexander Averin may refer to:
Aleksandr Averin (cyclist) (born 1954), Soviet Olympic cyclist
Aleksandr Averin (publicist) (born 1981), Russian political dissident and publicist
Oleksandr Averin (Alexander Averin), Ukrainian cross-country skiing trainer of the Turkish team at the 2006 Winter Olympics